Lunavada State, also known as Lunawada State, was a princely state in India during the time of the British Raj. Its last ruler acceded to the Union of India on 10 June 1948.

Lunavada State had an area of 1,005 km2 and fell under the Rewa Kantha Agency of the Bombay Presidency, later integrated into the Baroda and Gujarat States Agency. Its capital was located in Lunavada town in present-day Gujarat state, India.

History
According to tradition the predecessor state was established in 1225 by descendants of Sidhraj, Raja of Anhilwara Patan, as the state of Virpur. In 1434, Rana Bhimsinghji moved the capital to Lunavada on the other side of the Mahi river. Before the town was established, the area was controlled by the princely Sant State.

In 1826 Lunavada State became a British protectorate and was a second class state in the Rewa Kantha Agency. The capital was Lunavada town, said to have been founded in 1434. The 1901 census records that the population had a decrease of 28% in the previous decade, due to famine.

Col. HH Maharaja Sri Virbhadrasinhji Ranjitsinhji 1929/1986, born 8 June 1910 in Lunawada, invested with full ruling powers on 2 October 1930, Member of the Chamber of Princes, married Manher Kunwari [HH Maharani Kusum Kunwari of Lunawada], daughter of Capt. HH Maharana Raj Saheb Shri Sir Amarsinhji Banesinhji (Gangubha) of Wankaner, and had issue. He died in 1986.

Rulers
The rulers had the title 'Rana' and were accorded a status of 9-gun salute by the British authorities.

Ranas
 1674 - 1711                Bir Singh                          (d. 1711)
 1711 - 1735                Nar Singh                          (d. 1735)
 1735 - 1757                Wakhat Singh                       (d. 1757)
 1757 - 1782                Dip Singh                          (d. 1782)
 1782 - 1786                Durjan Singh                       (d. 1786)
 1786                       Jagat Singh
 1786 - 1818                Partab Singh
 1818 - 1849                Fateh Singh                        (d. 1849)
 1849 - 1851                Dalpat Singh                       (d. 1851)
 1851 - 1852                interregnum
 1852 - Jun 1867            Dalil Singh                        (d. 1867)
 31 Oct 1867 – 27 Apr 1929  Wakhat Singh Dalil Singh           (b. 1860 - d. 1929) (from 25 May 1889, Sir Wakhat Singh Dalil Singh)
 27 Apr 1929 – 15 Aug 1947  Virbhadra Singh Ranjit Singh       (b. 1910 - d. 1986)

See also
 Koli rebellions
 List of Koli people
 List of Koli states and clans
 List of Rajput dynasties
 Political integration of India

References

External links
Heraldry of the princely states of Gujarat

Princely states of India
History of Gujarat
Mahisagar district
Rajputs
15th-century establishments in India
1434 establishments in Asia
1948 disestablishments in India